December 3 - Eastern Orthodox liturgical calendar - December 5

All fixed commemorations below celebrated on December 17 by Eastern Orthodox Churches on the Old Calendar.

For December 4th, Orthodox Churches on the Old Calendar commemorate the Saints listed on November 21.

Saints
 Commemoration of the Twelve Prophets (Twelve Minor Prophets). 
 Apostle Crispus of the Seventy Apostles, Bishop of Chalcedon (1st century)
 Great-martyr Barbara, at Heliopolis in Syria (306) 
 Martyr Juliana, at Heliopolis in Syria (306) 
 Martyrs Christodoulos and Christodoula, by the sword. 
 Saint John the Wonderworker, Bishop of Polybotum, in Phrygia Salutaris (716) 
 Saint John of Damascus (John Damascene), monk of St. Sabbas Monastery (749)

Pre-Schism Western saints
 Saint Felix of Bologna, a Deacon of the Church of Milan with St Ambrose, and later the fifth Bishop of Bologna (429) 
 Saint Bertoara, Abbess of Notre-Dame-de-Sales in Bourges (614)
 Saint Ada, niece of Engebert, Bishop of Le Mans, she became a nun at Soissons, and Abbess in Le Mans (7th century)

Post-Schism Orthodox saints
 Venerable Cassian the Martyr (Kassianos), one of the "300 Allemagne Saints" in Cyprus (late 12th century) (see also October 6)
 Saint Gennadius of Novgorod, Archbishop of Novgorod (1504)
 New Hieromartyr Seraphim of Phanarion, Archbishop of Phanarion and Neochorion (1601)

New martyrs and confessors
 Hieromartyr Nicholas (Tsedrik), Priest (1917)
 New Martyrs of Perm (1918):
 Hieromartyrs Alexis Saburov, John Pyankov, Protopresbyters.
 Alexander Posokhin and Nicholas Yakhontov, Priests.
 Basil Kashin, Deacon, and with him 10 Martyrs.
 Hieromartyr Damascene (Tsedrik), Bishop of Glukhov, (son of priest Nicholas (Tsedrik)) (1935)
 Hieromartyr Demetrius Nevedomsky, Priest (1937)
 Virgin-martyrs Catherine Arskoy and Kyra Obolensky  (1937)
 Hieromartyr Alexander Hotovitzky, Hieromartyr of the Bolshevik yoke, Missionary of America (1937)

Other commemorations
 Icon of the Mother of God of Damascus (Panayia Tricherousa, "Three-handed Theotokos") (c. 717)

Icon gallery

Notes

References

Sources 
 December 4/17. Orthodox Calendar (PRAVOSLAVIE.RU).
 December 17 / December 4. HOLY TRINITY RUSSIAN ORTHODOX CHURCH (A parish of the Patriarchate of Moscow).
 December 4. OCA - The Lives of the Saints.
 December 4. Latin Saints of the Orthodox Patriarchate of Rome.
 The Roman Martyrology. Transl. by the Archbishop of Baltimore. Last Edition, According to the Copy Printed at Rome in 1914. Revised Edition, with the Imprimatur of His Eminence Cardinal Gibbons. Baltimore: John Murphy Company, 1916. pp. 373–374.
 Rev. Richard Stanton. A Menology of England and Wales, or, Brief Memorials of the Ancient British and English Saints Arranged According to the Calendar, Together with the Martyrs of the 16th and 17th Centuries. London: Burns & Oates, 1892. p. 583-585.
Greek Sources
 Great Synaxaristes:  4 ΔΕΚΕΜΒΡΙΟΥ. ΜΕΓΑΣ ΣΥΝΑΞΑΡΙΣΤΗΣ.
  Συναξαριστής. 4 Δεκεμβρίου. ECCLESIA.GR. (H ΕΚΚΛΗΣΙΑ ΤΗΣ ΕΛΛΑΔΟΣ). 
Russian Sources
  17 декабря (4 декабря). Православная Энциклопедия под редакцией Патриарха Московского и всея Руси Кирилла (электронная версия). (Orthodox Encyclopedia - Pravenc.ru).
  4 декабря (ст.ст.) 17 декабря 2013 (нов. ст.). Русская Православная Церковь Отдел внешних церковных связей. (DECR).

December in the Eastern Orthodox calendar